William Doran (born 1982 in Boolavogue, County Wexford) is an Irish sportsperson. He played hurling with his local club Buffer's Alley and was a member of the Wexford senior hurling team.

His uncle Tony and father Colm also played hurling with the Wexford senior hurling team.

References

Living people
1982 births
Buffer's Alley hurlers
Wexford inter-county hurlers